Néstor Errea (27 April 1939 – 3 June 2005) was an Argentine professional footballer who played as a goalkeeper. His nickname was "El Flaco" because of his tall, slender body physique.

Club career
Errea started football at an amateur level at Sacachispas in the Villa Soldati region of Buenos Aires. His professional career began in 1959 when he joined Atlético Atlanta. He played there until 1962 and then joined Boca Juniors, where he won 3 Championships. In 1966 he signed for Colón playing for a year before he travel to Uruguay to play for Peñarol, where during his short spell he managed to win an Uruguayan Primera División in 1967. Afterwards he made his return at Boca Juniors in 1968. In 1969 he signed for Estudiantes and in the season he played with the club he managed to win the Copa Libertadores two consecutive times and play in the 1970 Intercontinental Cup, where they lost 3–2 on aggregate to Feyenoord. In 1971 he played for Banfield for a year.

In the summer of 1972, the transfers of Latin American footballers to Greece, according to the current of the time, brought Errea alongside Rodolfo Vicente and Hugo Zeer to AEK Athens. He played with the "yellow-blacks" for 2 seasons, without managing to win any title. In the summer of 1975, he signed for Apollon Athens, where he played until 1977, when he moved to AO Chalkida to end his career in 1978.

International career
He played in two matches for Argentina in 1959 and 1961. He made his debut on 9 December 1959 in Argentina's 4–2 win over Paraguay for the 1959 South American Championship that took place in Ecuador, setting a record for the youngest player to appear in the national team. In 1961 he was called up again, where he played for the last time in a 4–1 away defeat by Italy on 15 June.

After football
Errea quickly acclimatized in Greece and after obtaining Greek citizenship in 1977, he stayed permanently in the country. For most of his stay, he lived in Larissa. Errea passed away on 3 June 2005, after suffering a severe stroke for which he was hospitalized at the "Asclepion" hospital at Voula.

Honours

Boca Juniors
Argentine Primera División: 1962, 1964, 1965

Peñarol
Uruguayan Primera División: 1967

Estudiantes
Copa Libertadores: 1969, 1970

References

External links

1939 births
2005 deaths
Club Atlético Atlanta footballers
Boca Juniors footballers
Club Atlético Colón footballers
Peñarol players
Estudiantes de La Plata footballers
Club Atlético Banfield footballers
AEK Athens F.C. players
Apollon Smyrnis F.C. players
Chalkida F.C. players
Copa Libertadores-winning players
Argentine footballers
Argentina international footballers
Super League Greece players
Argentine expatriate footballers
Argentine expatriate sportspeople in Uruguay
Expatriate footballers in Greece
Place of birth missing
Association football goalkeepers